Anna Nagar (formerly known as Naduvakkarai), is a neighbourhood in the metropolitan city of Chennai, India. Named after former chief minister of Tamil Nadu C. N. Annadurai, it is located in the north-western part of Chennai and forms a part of the Aminjikarai taluk and the Anna Nagar Zone. It is one of the prime residential areas in Chennai and is home to several prominent doctors, lawyers and politicians. Real estate prices are among the highest in the city. A recent addition to the area is VR Chennai Mall, located near Shanthi Colony and Thirumangalam junction.

Anna Nagar is the first and the only village near Chennai to follow a standard addressing system followed in the western world. One of the primary landmarks in Anna Nagar is the Anna Nagar Tower, built in 1968 as part of the World Trade Fair. Other important locations include the Anna Arch, Chinthamani, Blue Star, 14 shops, Shanthi Colony, Thirumangalam junction, Padi grade separator, Anna Nagar East, and the Anna Nagar West bus depot.

Anna Nagar has several established schools and colleges, places of worship, shopping areas with both independent shops and chain stores, and numerous restaurants. The 2nd avenue is an arterial road in Anna Nagar which has emerged as a hub for several restaurants and shops. There are also a number of midsize hospitals and nursing homes catering to the local population.

History

Anna Nagar originated as a suburban village called Naduvakkarai. It was called Mullam Village.

Anna Nagar was developed by the Tamil Nadu Housing Board in the early 1970s following the World Trade Fair in the area in 1968. The board developed residential plots, apartments, commercial complexes, wide roads, school zones, bus termini, and large parks.

Geography
As of 2018, Anna Nagar zone had a green cover of more than 20 percent, as against the city's 14.9 percent average.

Religion

Several prominent temples, churches and mosques are located in Anna Nagar.

Education
 Chinmaya Vidyalaya
Jaigopal Garodia Vivekananda Vidyalaya
Chennai Public School
SBOA School & Junior College
Valliammal Matriculation Higher Secondary School
CSI Jessie Moses Matriculation Higher Secondary School
 Shri Krishnaswamy Matriculation Higher Secondary School
 Kendriya Vidyalaya

Landmarks

Anna arch

A large twin arch called the Anna arch marks the entrance of the southern part of Anna Nagar on the Third Avenue, which was built in 1985 by the Corporation of Chennai at a cost of Rs. 1.2 million to commemorate the platinum jubilee celebrations of former chief minister C. N. Annadurai, when Anna Nagar was still a developing area. It was inaugurated by the then chief minister of Tamil Nadu, M. G. Ramachandran on 1 January 1986. Each arch stands 52 ft tall and weighs 82 tonnes. The road from the arch leads to the roundtana (roundabout) which is a major landmark and for all practical purposes, the centre of Anna Nagar.

In 2012, the arch was proposed to be demolished to leave way for a flyover that was planned to connect Anna Nagar with Aminjikarai. Demolition work began on 2 September 2012. However, the alignment of the flyover was modified slightly to prevent the removal of the arch, and the arch was restored at a cost of  6.4 million.

Anna Nagar Tower

Its main entrance is from the 3rd Main Road and a back entrance from the 6th main road. It is popular with morning walkers and joggers, and with families and young people in the evenings to play and relax. For a nominal fee, one could walk to the top of the tower from where excellent views of the city could be seen. Entry inside the tower has been stopped for the last few years due to safety concerns as there had been a few cases of suicide in the past. The tower and park are now renovated and has a skating rink. Currently, it boasts of a good turnout of children who come in for practising their skills on roller skates. There is also a group of regulars who practice silambattam - an ancient Tamil martial art form - here. From atop the tower one can have a panoramic views, and the rapidly changing skyline of the city can be appreciated.

Transport

Road

Anna Nagar has two bus termini, Anna Nagar West and Anna Nagar East. The East terminus is located near Anna Nagar Roundtana while the West terminus is situated on the Inner Ring Road. The West terminus is one of the largest bus terminuses in the city. Buses to different parts of the city beginning from the West Terminus.

The roads in Anna Nagar are designed based on a matrix structure similar to roads in developed countries in the western world; all the roads are laid parallel and perpendicular to each other. In addition, a standardized naming nomenclature is adopted. In Anna Nagar, 2nd, 4th and 6th Avenues run east–west and 1st, 3rd, 5th and 7th Avenues run North South. All the streets are interconnected to these avenues. Areas expanded after the formation of the initial 1970 layouts do not follow the standard nomenclature. Auto rickshaws, Share autos are also available connecting Anna Nagar to different parts of the city.

Anna Nagar Roundtana 

The Anna Nagar Roundtana located at the intersection of 2nd Avenue and 3rd Avenue is a sprawling and burgeoning high-scale commercial neighborhood. This was initially developed for the Madras EXPO during the 1970s and was named "Round Turn Over", whose name has colloquially changed to "Roundtana" with the use of Tamil Language. It has a wide variety of markets and showrooms in the vicinity such as Croma, Tanishq, Bata, etc. and thus is a very important landmark for shoppers.

Railway

The Anna Nagar railway station was inaugurated in the year 2003. It is located on the Thirumangalam road, a road that connects Anna Nagar West with Villivakkam. The railway line stretches for 3.09 kilometers and links Anna Nagar with the Tiruvallur-Chennai suburban line. Between 2003 and 2007, five suburban trains were operated from Anna Nagar to Chennai Beach via Villivakkam. The station was closed in 2007 for the construction of the Padi elevated rotary. However, after the completion of the rotary in 2009, the station remained closed owing to its low patronage. There were plans to reopen the station in 2011. None of them materialised, however.

Metro
Anna Nagar metro was inaugurated and started on 14 may, 2017. It is the most convenient form of transportation and connects every part of the city.Three underground metro stations, two in Anna Nagar and one in Anna Nagar East, which form a part of the phase 1 metro project. Anna Nagar has 2 metro stations - 1. Anna Nagar tower park metro station and 2. Anna Nagar East metro station. Both of these metro stations are underground. They are well managed and maintained. These metro stations have 2 platforms and their trains have different sections for women specially. These stations have 4 entry & exit points, which makes it accessible in all possible ways.

Politics
Anna Nagar (State Assembly Constituency) is part of Chennai Central (Lok Sabha constituency).

Location in Context

References

External links
  CSI Jessie Moses School
 JGVV
  Playschools Anna Nagar

Neighbourhoods in Chennai
Suburbs of Chennai
Cities and towns in Chennai district
Memorials to C. N. Annadurai